Alison or Allison Hawkins may refer to:

Allison Hawkins (Jericho), fictional character in Jericho
Alison Hawkins, character in The January Man